Zacarias Cenita Jimenez (5 November 1947 – 19 April 2018) was a Filipino Roman Catholic bishop.

Biography
Born on 5 November 1947 in Inabanga, Bohol in the Philippines, Jimenez was ordained to the priesthood on 17 April 1973 at the St. Joseph's Cathedral in Tagbilaran. He was consecrated as bishop on 6 January 1995 at the St. Peter's Basilica in the Vatican City.

He served as bishop of the Roman Catholic Diocese of Pagadian, Philippines, from 2 December 1994 to 11 June 2003. He then served as auxiliary bishop of the Roman Catholic Diocese of Butuan, Philippines and as titular bishop of Arba from 11 June 2003 until his death.

He was discharged from a hospital on 15 April 2018 after suffering a second stroke but died at 8:01 a.m on 19 April due to acute respiratory failure in Butuan.

Notes

1947 births
2018 deaths
People from Bohol
21st-century Roman Catholic bishops in the Philippines
20th-century Roman Catholic bishops in the Philippines